The 2012 Tropical Storm Debby tornado outbreak was a tropical cyclone-produced severe-weather event that affected the U.S. state of Florida for nearly 3 days on June 23–26, 2012. As of 12:25 p.m. EDT on June 25, the Storm Prediction Center in Norman, Oklahoma, had received 25 tornado reports from Florida, including one fatality near Venus. Throughout the entire event, 25 tornadoes touched down across the state, making the outbreak the second largest on record in Florida, behind only that spawned by Hurricane Agnes, which produced 28 tornadoes on June 18–19, 1972. At least ten of the tornadoes—the largest 24-hour total in South Florida since Hurricane Isbell produced eight in 1964—had been confirmed in four South Florida counties by the National Weather Service forecast office in Miami.

Event summary
At 3:44 p.m. CDT on June 23, as Tropical Storm Debby was located west of Florida, the SPC in Norman first noted an increasing potential for severe weather in Southwest Florida, including tornadoes, due to increasing wind shear in the lower levels of the atmosphere. Later, at 7:09 p.m. CDT, the SPC highlighted a threat of waterspouts in the region. On June 24 at 10:45 a.m. CDT, after two possible tornadoes had already been reported, the first Tornado Watch was issued for 22 counties in Central and South Florida. As of 4:00 a.m. CDT on June 25, a Tornado Watch remained in effect in portions of Central Florida. Despite the tornado watches, no tornadoes were confirmed on June 25. However, on June 26 a lone tornado touched down as Debby lingered over Florida.

Confirmed tornadoes

June 23 event

June 24 event

June 26 event

See also
List of North American tornadoes and tornado outbreaks

References

Tornadoes of 2012
Tornadoes in Florida
Tropical Storm Debby tornado outbreak, 2012
June 2012 events in the United States
2012 in Florida
F2 tornadoes